Jack William Rutter (born October 12, 1999), better known as Ritt Momney, is an American singer from Salt Lake City, Utah. His stage name is a spoonerism of American politician Mitt Romney, who was the Republican nominee during the 2012 United States presidential election and is currently a United States Senator representing Rutter’s home state of Utah since 2019.

Early life
Rutter was born on October 12, 1999, in Dallas, Texas. When he was about two years old, his family moved to Salt Lake City, where he resides to this day. He grew up in a heavily LDS community, which influenced his early musical career. Rutter graduated from East High School in Salt Lake City.

Career 
Ritt Momney was previously the name of an indie band formed by Rutter in high-school, but he became a solo artist after his bandmates departed to become LDS missionaries.

Rutter recorded a cover version of the song of "Put Your Records On", which was released on April 24, 2020, originally independently through DistroKid and later re-released through Disruptor Records and Columbia Records. The song became a sleeper hit after gaining popularity on the video sharing service TikTok in September 2020. Domestically, it peaked at number 30 on the Billboard Hot 100. The song also charted in the top 40 of 15 countries, and peaked in the top 10 in Australia and New Zealand.

When asked about Ritt, U.S. Senator Mitt Romney said, "They say that imitation is the sincerest form of flattery. In all seriousness, I wish Ritt Momney the best of luck in his music career and all his future endeavors."

Political position
Rutter considers himself to be on the political left.

Discography

Albums

Singles

As lead artist

References

External links

1999 births
Living people
Latter Day Saints from Texas
Latter Day Saints from Utah
People from Dallas
People from Salt Lake City
Singers from Texas
Singers from Utah